Theodor Hüllinghoff (born 18 October 1910, date of death unknown) was a German rower. He competed in the men's eight event at the 1932 Summer Olympics.

References

1910 births
Year of death missing
German male rowers
Olympic rowers of Germany
Rowers at the 1932 Summer Olympics
Rowers from Frankfurt